The Menasco M-50  was an American four-cylinder horizontally-opposed aircraft engine.

Design and development
The engine was developed from 1937-1938 for use in Aeronca model KM light aircraft. Despite there being a deal for an estimated 500 Menasco M50 engines, only 10 engines were delivered as the deal broke down. Despite being initially being designed for aircraft usage, M-50 engines were also used to power midget race cars in Los Angeles. The failure of the engine in the market could be attributed towards the late entry for the engine into the market meant that the engine was soon overshadowed by more technologically advanced engines developed by its competitors such as the 65 hp (48 kW) flat-four engines from Continental and Franklin.

Applications
Aeronca KM

Specifications

See also

References

M-50
1930s aircraft piston engines